The 1930–31 National Hurling League was the fifth edition of the National Hurling League, which ran from 1 March 1931 to 29 November 1931.

The twelve participating teams were Antrim, Clare, 
Cork, Dublin, Galway, Kilkenny, Laois, Meath, Offaly, Tipperary, Waterford and Wexford,  who were divided into three different divisions. Each team played each of their rivals once with two points awarded for a win and one point awarded for a drawn game.

Galway defeated Tipperary by 4–5 to 4–4 in the final, achieving their first win.

National Hurling League

Results

External links
1930-31 National Hurling League results

References

National Hurling League seasons
League
League